The Pulaski Yankees were a minor league baseball team based in Pulaski, Virginia, United States. They were an Advanced Rookie League team in the Appalachian League. The team played its home games at Calfee Park. They were affiliated with several Major League Baseball teams, including the New York Yankees in their final season.

The Pulaski Yankees were awarded Minor League Baseball's top honor, the John H. Johnson President's Award, in 2019. The award recognizes the "complete baseball franchise—based on franchise stability, contributions to league stability, contributions to baseball in the community, and promotion of the baseball industry."

The start of the 2020 season was postponed due to the COVID-19 pandemic before ultimately being cancelled on June 30. In conjunction with a contraction of Minor League Baseball beginning with the 2021 season, the Appalachian League was reorganized as a collegiate summer baseball league, and the Yankees were replaced by a new franchise, the Pulaski River Turtles, in the revamped league designed for rising college freshmen and sophomores.

Pulaski baseball history
 Pulaski Counts, -
 Pulaski Phillies, -, -
 Pulaski Cubs, -
 Pulaski Braves, -
 Pulaski Rangers, -
 Pulaski Blue Jays, -
 Pulaski Mariners, -
 Pulaski Yankees, -

Pulaski was the 2010 Appalachian League Eastern Division Champion.

Ballpark

The Pulaski Yankees played at Calfee Park. Calfee Park opened in 1935 and had a capacity of 3,200 fans. A number of houses that surround the park had good views of games.

The park had major renovations prior to the  season, with a new grandstand behind the plate and along the first-base side as well as "open-air suites" (railed-in areas with picnic tables) farther down on the first-base line. A new scoreboard was also installed.

Since the Shelor Automotive Group purchased Calfee Park from the Town of Pulaski in 2015, ownership has completed numerous upgrades including a renovated home team clubhouse; a new visiting team clubhouse, concession stand, press box, and souvenir store; the addition of two VIP Towers, upgrading seating, and a 35’ x 22’ JumboTron; a Bermuda grass playing field and new irrigation system; construction of new home offices for ballpark employees; and the expansion of the upper concourse.

Most recently prior to the 2019 season, a three-tiered party deck and new boxes were added along the third base line, increasing the ballpark's capacity to 3,200. Additional upgrades including 800 new seats behind the party deck and new concessions points of sale were planned for 2020 before being put on hold due to the COVID-19 pandemic.

Calfee Park was voted the best rookie-level ballpark in America in 2019 and 2020 by a fan vote in Ballpark Digest's annual Best of the Ballparks competition.

Playoffs
2019: Lost to Burlington 2–1 in semifinals.
2017: Defeated Bluefield 2–1 in semifinals; lost to Elizabethton 2–0 in finals.
2015: Lost to Princeton 2–1 in semifinals.
2013: Defeated Bluefield 2–0 in semifinals; defeated Greeneville 2–0 to win championship.
2010: Lost to Elizabethton 2–0 in semifinals.
2008: Lost to Elizabethton 2–0 in finals.
1999: Lost to Martinsville 2–0 in finals.
1997: Lost to Bluefield 2–0 in finals.
1991: Defeated Burlington 2–0 to win championship.
1989: Lost to Elizabethton 2–0 in finals.
1986: Defeated Johnson City 2–1 to win championship.
1984: Lost to Elizabethton 1–0 in finals.

Notable Pulaski alumni

 Steve Avery (1988) MLB All-Star
 Jeff Blauser (1984) 2 x MLB All-Star
 Don Cardwell (1954)
 Larry Christenson (1972)
 Mark Clear (1974) 2 x MLB All-Star
 Julio Cruz (MGR, 1997)
 David Elder (1997)
 Jim Essian (1970)
 Tony Graffanino (1990)
 Dallas Green (1970, MGR) Manager: 1980 World Series Champion - Philadelphia Phillies
 Aaron Harang (1999)
 David Justice (1985) 3 x MLB All-Star; 1990 NL Rookie of the Year
 Mike Lamb (1997)
 Kameron Loe (2002)
 Colby Lewis (1999)
 Grady Little (MGR, 1986–1987)
 Javy López (1989) 3 x MLB All-Star
 Jerry Martin (1971)
 Kevin Mench (1999) 
 Urban Meyer (1983) College Football Coach
 Travis Snider, Pulaski Blue Jays
 Jason Schmidt (1992) 3 x MLB All-Star
 Mike Stanton (1987) MLB All-Star
 Eugenio Vélez, Pulaski Blue Jays
 Turk Wendell (1988)
 C. J. Wilson (2001) 2 x MLB All-Star
 Mark Wohlers (1988-1989) MLB All-Star

References
 Avallone, Michael. "Minor League Baseball returns to Pulaski." MiLB.com. 21 December 2007.

External links
 
 Statistics from Baseball-Reference

Baseball teams established in 1982
Baseball teams disestablished in 2020
Defunct Appalachian League teams
Professional baseball teams in Virginia
Pulaski County, Virginia
New York Yankees minor league affiliates
Toronto Blue Jays minor league affiliates
Texas Rangers minor league affiliates
Atlanta Braves minor league affiliates
Philadelphia Phillies minor league affiliates
Chicago Cubs minor league affiliates
Brooklyn Dodgers minor league affiliates
1982 establishments in Virginia
2020 disestablishments in Virginia